The Tri-Valley area is grouping of three valleys in the East Bay region of California's Bay Area. The three valleys are Amador Valley, San Ramon Valley, and Livermore Valley. The Tri-Valley encompasses the cities of Dublin, Livermore, Pleasanton and San Ramon, the town of Danville and the CDPs of Alamo, Blackhawk and Diablo. The area is known for its Mediterranean climate, wineries, and nature. It is primarily suburban in character. The United States Census Bureau defines an urban area centered in the cities of Livermore, Pleasanton, and Dublin with a 2020 population of 240,381, ranked 167th in the United States in terms of population. The total population of the area is estimated to be 361,000. It offers more affordable living accommodations than the cities of San Francisco and San Jose.

History 
The Ohlone tribe settled the area circa 2000 BC, particularly in the northern part of Pleasanton. In AD 1772, however, Spanish settlers involved with the nearby mission work at Mission San Jose restructured the Ohlone way of life. 

The area began to be developed when the Gold Rush ended. During this period, the area went from being marshland to agricultural.

Climate 
The climate of the Tri-Valley is mild. Most rain falls in the winter. Snow almost never occurs, although it sometimes falls on the tops of surrounding mountains, especially Mt. Diablo. Summer days are in the 80s to over 100 °F, but nights are often cool. In winter, daytime temperatures reach the 50s and 60s, while nights are in the 30s and 40s, dipping on rare occasions into the 20s.

Transportation 
The Tri-Valley is serviced by WHEELS, operated by the Livermore Amador Valley Transit Authority (LAVTA), a bus agency that operates local bus service throughout Livermore, Pleasanton and Dublin, including service to  Hacienda Business Park, Lawrence Livermore National Laboratory, Las Positas College, Stoneridge Mall, the West Dublin/Pleasanton BART Station and the Dublin/Pleasanton BART station.

Two major highways, Interstates 580 and 680 cross the Tri-Valley area. Interstate 580 runs east-west, connecting the area to the Central Valley to the east and the North Bay area to the west. Interstate 680 runs north-south, connecting the area to the South Bay area in the south, and the Concord-Walnut Creek area in the north. The two interstates cross on the border of Dublin and Pleasanton.

The Tri-Valley area is also serviced by BART, offering service to the rest of the San Francisco Bay Area via two stops: West Dublin/Pleasanton and the Dublin/Pleasanton terminus station. The West Dublin/Pleasanton Station opened in 2011, and was the first infill station on an existing line. In 2018, BART cancelled plans to extend the line to Livermore. However, the Tri-Valley San Joaquin Valley Regional Rail Authority is in the planning process for a rail connection between BART, ACE, and the San Joaquin Valley.

Economy 
The Tri-Valley is home to the corporate headquarters of many companies, including 24 Hour Fitness, Architectural Glass and Aluminum, Bay Area News Group, Blackhawk Network Holdings, CallidusCloud, Chevron, The Cooper Companies, Discovery Toys, Ellie Mae, GE Digital, Gillig Corporation, Patelco Credit Union, Prosoft Engineering, Ross Stores, SafeAmerica Credit Union, Safeway, Shaklee, TriNet, Veeva Systems, Visioneer, WANdisco, The Wine Group, Product10x Accelerator, Salestable and Workday.

Major employment centers include Bishop Ranch and Hacienda Business Park.

Lawrence Livermore National Laboratory and Sandia National Laboratories are also major employers in the region.

Recreation 
The Tri-Valley features access to many recreational options, including Alviso Adobe Community Park, Blackhawk Museum, Brushy Peak Regional Preserve, Del Valle Regional Park, Dublin Hills Regional Park, Eugene O'Neill National Historic Site, Forest Home Farms, Iron Horse Regional Trail, Las Trampas Regional Wilderness, Little Hills Picnic Ranch, Livermore Valley Wine Country, Morgan Territory Regional Preserve, Mount Diablo State Park, Pleasanton Ridge Regional Park, Shadow Cliffs Regional Recreation Area and The Wave Waterpark.

See also
 East Bay (San Francisco Bay Area)
 Tri-Valley Community Television
 Livermore Valley AVA

References

Geography of Alameda County, California
Subregions of the San Francisco Bay Area
Regions of California
San Ramon, California
Amador Valley
Livermore Valley
Dublin, California
Pleasanton, California
Danville, California